Antispila orbiculella is a moth of the family Heliozelidae. It was described by Kuroko in 1961. It is found in Japan (Kyushu and Yakushima).

The wingspan is 4-4.5 mm. The forewings are dark bronzy-fuscous with reddish reflections. The basal area is shining leaden-bronze. The markings are silvery-metallic with yellowish or bluish reflections. The hindwings are pale fuscous with feeble purplish lusters. Adults appear from mid June to the beginning of July. There is one generation per year.

The larvae feed on Ampelopsis glandulosa. They mine the leaves of their host plant. The mine has the form of a full depth orthogenous blotch mine. It is pale greenish brown, although the central area is blackish brown. Usually, one mine is found on a single leaf, but sometimes two or three may be found. The mine usually extends between two ribs of the leaf. The frass is blackish brown and is deposited in grains in a circle around the central area, although some frass is smeared inside of the epidermis of the central area of the mine. Larvae can be found feeding from the end of August to September. Full-grown larvae create a case which is cut out from the central part of the mine and descend to the ground. They hibernate within this case. Pupation occurs at the end of May of the following year.

References

Moths described in 1961
Heliozelidae
Moths of Japan